Jella Haase (born 27 October 1992) is a German actress. She began acting in theatre at a very early age. Her film credits include , Fack ju Göhte and Combat Girls.  She has also appeared on the television shows Polizeiruf 110 and Alpha 0.7 – Der Feind in dir. She won the Bavarian Film Award for Best Young Actress in 2012, the Günter Strack Television Award in 2013 and earned a nomination at the German Film Awards in 2014.

Biography 
Haase was born in Berlin-Kreuzberg. Her mother is a dentist. Haase began her career as a child actor in drama theatre. In 2009, she made her film debut in the short film Der letzte Rest at age 15. Her first major role was in the television film Mama kommt! It was followed by other TV productions, including two appearances in Polizeiruf 110. In 2010, she starred in six episodes of Alpha 0.7 – Der Feind in dir.

In 2011, she appeared in the movie . For this role, and also for the 2011 's directorial debut film , she received the Bavarian Film Award for Best Young Actress in 2012.

In 2013, she played an underage prostitute who films herself having sex with judges to blackmail them, in the film Puppenspieler. In the same year, she played teenager Chantal Ackermann in the comedy film Fack ju Göhte directed by Bora Dağtekin. For her role, she was nominated for the German Film Award for Best Actress in a Supporting Role in 2014. 

In 2022, she starred in the Netflix comedy-drama spy series Kleo, which was renewed for a second season.

Awards

References

External links 

 

1992 births
Living people
German film actresses
German television actresses
21st-century German actresses
People from Friedrichshain-Kreuzberg
Actresses from Berlin